The Syrian National Army (SNA), previously the Free Syrian Army (FSA) and also known as the Turkish-backed Free Syrian Army (TFSA), is a coalition of armed Syrian opposition groups in the Syrian Civil War. Comprising various rebel factions that emerged at the onset of the war in July 2011, it was officially established in 2017 under the auspices of Turkey, which provides funding, training, and military support.

The SNA has its roots in the FSA, a loose collection of armed opposition groups founded on 29 July 2011 by defected Syrian military officers. After formally condemning the regime of Bashar al-Assad, Turkey provided arms, training, and sanctuary to the organization. Initially the principal opponent of the Syrian government, the FSA was gradually weakened by infighting, lack of funding, and the emergence of rival Islamist groups. From August 2016, Turkey began assembling a new coalition of Syrian rebel groups, which included many former FSA fighters, in an effort to create a more cohesive and effective opposition force; following Operation Euphrates Shield, the Turkish government coordinated with the Syrian Interim Government to form a "National Army" to secure Turkish territorial gains.

The official aims of the SNA are to create a "safe zone" in northern Syria, consolidate with other rebel factions, and combat both Syrian government forces and Islamists. Its presence expanded to the neighboring Idlib Governorate during the Syrian government's 2019 northwestern offensive, after which it incorporated the National Front for Liberation on 4 October 2019.

Closely aligned with the Turkish government, the SNA has been described as an auxiliary army of the Turkish Armed Forces and as "mercenaries" by their critics. Outside Syria, SNA fighters have been deployed by Turkey as a proxy force in conflicts from Libya to the south Caucasus. The SNA mostly consists of Arabs and Syrian Turkmen.

Composition

The SNA, which includes at least 25,000 fighters according to one of its senior commanders, mostly consists of Arabs and Turkmens. The number of Syrian Kurds among the SNA is much smaller. In January 2018, senior SNA commander Azad Shabo said that there were "dozens" among the FSA units such as the Azadî Battalion, while Almodon Online reported about 500 Kurdish fighters overall, including in non-FSA formations such as Ahrar al-Sham, the Levant Front and the Army of Grandchildren. By February 2018, a SNA commander said that 350 Kurds were part of the Syrian National Army.

By the end of June 2017, most Turkish-backed FSA groups reorganized themselves into three military blocs: Victory, Sultan Murad and the Levant. A number of other groups remained independent. On 30 December 2017, the groups unified to form the National Army. By this time, three "legions" were established as part of the SNA: 1st, 2nd, and 3rd. On 15 March 2018, rebel factions in northern Homs Governorate formed the 4th Legion, though it later transferred to northern Aleppo. Factions also moved from Rif Dimashq Governorate and Damascus to northern Aleppo.

On 4 October 2019, the National Front for Liberation joined the National Army's command structure, planning to become its 4th, 5th, 6th, and 7th legions. Both NFL and SNA fighters were uninformed of the merger, which took place in a press conference in Urfa, southern Turkey, amid Turkish plans to launch an offensive against the Syrian Democratic Forces (SDF).

According to a 2019 research paper published by the pro-government Turkish think tank SETA, "Out of the 28 factions [in the Syrian National Army], 21 were previously supported by the United States, three of them via the Pentagon’s program to combat Islamic State of Iraq and the Levant (ISIL). Eighteen of these factions were supplied by the CIA via the MOM Operations Room in Turkey, a joint intelligence operation room of the ‘Friends of Syria’ to support the armed opposition. Fourteen factions of the 28 were also recipients of the U.S.-supplied TOW anti-tank guided missiles."

In April 2021, an additional military formation was made in Idlib, named 'al-Quwat al-Radifa' (Auxiliary Forces).

By September 2021, groups under the Syrian National Army have coalesced into two main blocs: the Azm Operations Room and the Syrian Front for Liberation. Speaking of these blocs, a freelance journalist based in the region said that "These formations are only for show and they are not united in reality. Each faction still has its own leaders and members who do not take orders from the leaders of other factions. These formations only aim to protect themselves. Whenever factions feel threatened, they form new military bodies to protect themselves, but once the threat is gone, the formations fall apart."

Background

Connection with Turkey

The Free Syrian Army (FSA) was the Syrian rebel faction most aligned with the Turkish state since the beginning of the Turkish involvement in the Syrian Civil War. For the FSA, Turkey was a sanctuary and a source of supplies. In the aftermath of the Kurdish-Turkish conflict restarting in 2015, the Turkish government became more influential throughout 2016, as other countries began to scale back their involvement and the rebel groups became more dependent on Turkish help. The Turkey-backed FSA's wages are paid for by the Turkish government, they operate alongside the Turkish Armed Forces. Injured Turkey-backed FSA troops have been treated in Turkey.

The Free Police have more overt connections to Turkey, reportedly wearing Turkish police uniforms decorated with the word "Polis" (Turkish for "Police"), while Special Forces wear distinctive light blue berets also worn by Turkish Gendarmerie. Some wore a Turkish flag patch on their uniforms at the inauguration ceremony on 24 January 2017.

On 18 April 2018, the Raqqa Military Council, which consists of 6 groups, was announced in the city of Urfa in southeastern Turkey.

Operational history

2016: Operation Euphrates Shield
The organization's first known engagement was a joint operation with the Turkish Armed Forces. In the first day, they took control of Jarabulus from ISIL. After this, they expanded northeast, meeting with units of the Syrian Democratic Forces north of Manbij. They successfully pushed the SDF out of the Jarablus area and captured all its settlements; the Euphrates river was used as a demarcation line, with forces on the opposing sides. On at least one occasion, American troops came to form a joint operation with Turkey; however after the TFSA's Ahrar al-Sharqiya Brigade's verbal attacks ("crusaders", "pigs") against them, the US troops withdrew, being escorted from the area by US-backed units in the TFSA, including the Hamza Division and the al-Mu'tasim Brigade. A U.S. defense official confirmed the event, but said that U.S. soldiers were still deployed in the area. The joint forces pushed ISIL to the south. After this success, Turkey-backed FSA made contact near Mare with the SDF forces from the Afrin Canton. Contact between the two saw the group attack some SDF-held towns with Turkish artillery support. The attacks were repelled, with casualties on both sides.

In February 2017, the Turkish-backed Free Syrian Army and the Turkish Armed Forces advanced to besiege al-Bab. By 27 February, the group and Turkish Armed Forces seized al-Bab. As of February 2017, 470 fighters of the Turkish-backed Free Syrian Army died in Operation Euphrates Shield, while the Turkish armed forces lost 68.

As of March 2017, the TFSA and the Turkish army were effectively blocked from moving further east by advances of the SAA. This occurred when the SDF's Manbij Military Council handed over some territory bordering the Turkish positions to the SAA, creating a buffer zone. As a result, the TFSA failed to achieve other stated goals, including capturing the SDF-held city of Manbij and participating in the Coalition offensive on Raqqa.

On 24 September 2017, the Hamza Division announced the opening of a military academy in the city of al-Bab. According to Abdullah Halawa, military commander of the group, 2,200 fighters will undergo two months of training in the academy, with the goal of forming a "Syrian National Army" in northern Syria.

2018: Operation Olive Branch

On 20 January 2018, Turkey launched a new operation in Afrin Region, against the Kurdish-led Democratic Union Party (PYD) in Syria. The SNA conducted ground offensives against the YPG and SDF supported by and in conjunction with Turkish armed forces (TAF/TSK) air strikes, artillery, armored units, and special forces units. The first phase of the operation is to capture the entire Afrin-Turkey border. On 1 February, the SNA captured the strategic town of Bulbul after a fierce battle with the Kurdish-led People's Protection Units (YPG). In early March, the second phase of Operation Olive Branch was launched after successfully clearing the entire Afrin-Turkey border. On 3 March, after fierce fighting, the SNA captured the town of Rajo. On 8 March, the SNA captured Jinderes, meaning that they now have control over all major roads leading to the city of Afrin. On 13 March, SNA forces reached Afrin city and encircled it. On 18 March, the SNA took full control of Afrin, marking their second big victory after Operation Euphrates Shield. Since the capture of Afrin city, SNA forces have been busy clearing the recently captured areas of mines and providing security and stability to the region. As of 13 June SNA forces have dismantled 240 mines and 1,231 IEDs.

2019: Operation Dawn of Idlib and Operation Peace Spring 

By 16 August, the SNA sent considerable reinforcements to the frontlines of Hama and Idlib, where the Syrian Arab Army was launching an offensive against HTS and various rebel groups. Following this, rebel forces launched another heavy attack on the government-held village of Sukayk.

On 9 October 2019, Turkish Armed Forces, together with the Syrian National Army, had launched what they called Operation Peace Spring against SDF to eradicate what Turkish President Erdogan called "the threat of terror" against Turkey. On 13 October, Peace Spring forces captured the border town of tal Abyad. After the conclusion of the Second Battle of Ras al-Ayn on 20 October, SDF fighters retreated from the border town of Ras al Ain during the cease fire, which was brokered by the United States and Turkey. On 25 November, the operation was completed, after securing the territories between Ras al Ayn and Tal Abyad.

2020: Turkish military intervention in Libya, 2020 Nagorno-Karabakh war, and Ayn Issa clashes
Turkey has been hiring and transporting fighters from the Syrian National Army to support and bolster the manpower of the GNA. Several SNA member groups volunteered for the operation despite strong objections of the Syrian Interim Government. Up to 481 have died in combat.

In September, Turkey deployed 2,580 fighters from the Syrian National Army to fight in Nagorno-Karabakh, where according to  SOHR, up to 541 have died in combat.

On 2 December, Lebanon's al-Akhbar newspaper reported that the SDF managed to ambush Turkish-backed forces, killing 30 fighters.

Internal conflict

On 26 March 2016, Ahrar ash-Sham ordered the anti-YPG Kurdish FSA group Liwa Ahfad Saladin to remove the flag of Kurdistan from their posts and threatened military action if they did not. However, Liwa Ahfad Saladin's commander denied the incident ever occurred and stated Ahrar ash-Sham to be its ally.

On 27 September 2016, several Ahrar al-Sham fighters publicly burned a FSA flag in Azaz. The Ahrar al-Sham spokesman denied involvement and the incident sparked pro-FSA demonstrations in the city.

On 14 November 2016, the Levant Front and the Sultan Murad Division clashed at the Azaz border gate with Kilis, Turkey. Ahrar al-Sham and the Nour al-Din al-Zenki Movement, a former member of the Levant Front, joined the fighting after they said the Levant Front leaders was "acting like gangs".

On 3 April 2017, Ahrar al-Sham reportedly attacked Liwa Ahfad Saladin in Qabasin and captured more than 8 of their fighters, including a commander. Hours later, the prisoners were released after negotiations, although tensions between the two groups remain.

On 13 April 2017, clashes broke out between the Levant Front and the Sultan Suleyman Shah Brigade 100 kilometers north of Aleppo after both groups said the other was committing corruption. The Sultan Murad Division, the Hamza Division, and the Northern Hawks Brigade sided with the Sultan Suleyman Shah Brigade during the clashes.

On 14 May 2017, two separate clashes in Jarabulus and Gandura pitted the Ahrar al-Sharqiya Brigade against the Sultan Murad Division and the Sham Legion. The fighting stopped after the intervention of the Turkish Army.

On 22 May, the Levant Front attacked the Sham Legion near Azaz. The Levant Front said the Sham Legion was conspiring with the Nour al-Din al-Zenki Movement, part of Tahrir al-Sham. The LF besieged the Sham Legion headquarters, captured a number of their fighters, and seized several ammunition dumps.

Between 24 and 25 May, 5 FSA factions including the Levant Front, the Hamza Division, and the Sultan Murad Division conducted a joint attack on the Revolutionary Knights Brigade between Azaz and al-Rai and captured more than 20 of their fighters, in addition to killing and wounding at least 10. The FSA factions said the Revolutionary Knights Brigade was affiliated to the Nour al-Din al-Zenki Movement and Tahrir al-Sham and partaking in smuggling, looting, extortion, and abuses of civilians.

Between 4 and 15 June, heavy fighting broke out between TFSA factions led by the Sultan Murad Division and Ahrar al-Sham and its allies in and near al-Bab. By 15 June, 33 people were killed and 55 injured in the infighting. On 8 June, between 60 and 70 TFSA fighters, including several Sultan Murad Division commanders, defected to the Syrian Army and the Syrian Democratic Forces during the clashes.

On 3 July 2017, Mahmoud Khallo, commander of the Descendants of Saladin Brigade, declared that his unit would not participate in a planned Turkish-led offensive against the YPG and SDF in the Afrin District and the Shahba region. Following the announcement, the group was attacked by multiple Turkish-backed groups, which captured the group's positions and warehouses with vehicles and equipment. On 14 July, Khallo himself was captured by the Levant Front, which said he was affiliated with both al-Qaeda and the Democratic Union Party (PYD), and was tortured. The Levant Front then handed him over to Turkish security forces, who interrogated him. After being released soon after, Khallo protested against his unit's treatment and criticized that "Turkey was apparently only interested in using the Syrian militias to further its own strategic goals". He also said that Liwa Ahfad Saladin, now without weapons, would set up a political party.

On 25 March 2018, following the capture of Afrin a week earlier, clashes broke out between the Hamza Division and Ahrar al-Sharqiya in the city, resulting in the latter group capturing around 200 fighters from the former. A ceasefire agreement between the two groups was signed on the same day under the auspices of Turkey.

On 18 November 2018, at least 25 militants were killed and dozens wounded in heavy clashes between Turkish-backed insurgent factions in the northwestern Syrian city of Afrin. The clashes primarily occurred in the Mahmudiya and Villat neighborhoods, killing 14 fighters from Ahrar al-Sharqiya and nine from the other groups.

Reported war crimes

In September 2016, after their capture of Jarabulus from ISIL, Sultan Murad Division fighters published pictures of themselves torturing four YPG prisoners of war.

In June 2017, the Kurdish National Council said the rebels kidnapped 55 Kurdish civilians and displaced hundreds of Yazidis in northern Aleppo.

Several cases of Human rights violations have been reported by the Syrian Observatory for Human rights (SOHR). According to Kurdish sources, Kurdish local politician Hevrin Khalaf was executed near Qamishli by the Syrian National Army, her death was later confirmed by the SOHR. SOHR further reported that at least 9 civilians had been executed by the rebel troops.

On 3 October 2018, the Glory Corps attempted to seize 4 houses inhabited by displaced families from Arbin in Afrin city to use as headquarters, but were stopped by the Sultan Murad Division and the rebel military police.

On 27 January 2019, Glory Corps and Sham Legion fighters kidnapped a doctor from his clinic in Afrin and tortured him, and said he was a member of the Democratic Union Party (PYD); the Sham Legion denied its fighters were involved.

After the SNA captured the border town of Tell Abyad and its surroundings during the offensive in northern and eastern Syria in October 2019, Glory Corps fighters reportedly kidnapped several young men from Bîr Atwan village, west of Tell Abyad, and beat and humiliated them. On 22 October, fighters from the group trampled and mutilated the body of what appeared to be a Women's Protection Units (YPJ) fighter they killed in the countryside near Kobanî, laughing while they did so. The SNA captured four unarmed people and promptly executed them on a road.

Notes

References

Anti-ISIL factions in Syria
Anti-government factions of the Syrian civil war
Military units and factions of the Syrian civil war
Military units and formations of the 2020 Nagorno-Karabakh war
Operations rooms of the Syrian civil war
Rebel groups that actively control territory
Rebel groups in Syria
 
Turkish supported militant groups of the Syrian civil war
2016 establishments in Syria